Bezang-e Hajjiabad (also Romanized as Bezang-e Ḩājjīābād; also known as Bezang) is a village in Gughar Rural District, in the Central District of Baft County, Kerman Province, Iran. At the 2006 census, its population was 22, in 5 families.

References 

Populated places in Baft County